The Big Picture  is an Indian Hindi-language television game show that aired from 16 October 2021 to 9 January 2022 on Colors TV. It was hosted by Ranveer Singh.

Overview

The Big Picture is a 12-stage trivia - based game show in which participants answer multiple-choice questions related to images that appear in front of them on a large screen. The quiz game show gives the audience a chance to win a fortune. With the help of three lifelines, the contestant will have to answer 12 visual - based questions to win the prize money. The quiz show tests contestants’ knowledge and visual memory and gives them a chance to win Rs 5 crore. The show is hosted by Bollywood actor Ranveer Singh

Guest appearances

Production
The first promo debuted on 3 July 2021, featuring Ranveer Singh as host.

References

See also
List of programmes broadcast by Colors TV

Indian game shows
Hindi-language television shows
Colors TV original programming